Kelly Township is one of fourteen townships in Cooper County, Missouri, USA.  As of the 2000 census, its population was 676.

Kelly Township was named after John Kelley, a pioneer citizen.

Geography
According to the United States Census Bureau, Kelly Township covers an area of 66.69 square miles (172.74 square kilometers); of this, 66.61 square miles (172.53 square kilometers, 99.88 percent) is land and 0.08 square miles (0.21 square kilometers, 0.12 percent) is water.

Cities, towns, villages
 Bunceton

Extinct towns
 Petersburg at 
(These towns are listed as "historical" by the USGS.)

Adjacent townships
 Palestine Township (north)
 Clark Fork Township (northeast)
 North Moniteau Township (east)
 South Moniteau Township (east)
 Willow Fork Township, Moniteau County (south)
 Mill Creek Township, Morgan County (southwest)
 Lebanon Township (west)

Cemeteries
The township contains these five cemeteries: Chilton, Hopewell, Howard, Masonic and Woods.

Major highways
  Missouri Route 5

School districts
 Cooper County C-4
 Moniteau County R-Vi School District
 Otterville R-Vi
 Pilot Grove C-4

Political districts
 Missouri's 6th congressional district
 State House District 117
 State Senate District 21

References
 United States Census Bureau 2008 TIGER/Line Shapefiles
 United States Board on Geographic Names (GNIS)
 United States National Atlas

External links
 US-Counties.com
 City-Data.com

Townships in Cooper County, Missouri
Townships in Missouri